Postplatyptilia boletus is a moth of the family Pterophoridae. It is known from Peru.

The wingspan is about 14 mm. Adults are on wing in October.

Etymology
The name reflects the mushroom shaped antrum.

References

boletus
Moths described in 2006